Julius Stumpf (1836 - 1932) was a German physician and scientist who used white clay from Germany to treat a deadly form of Asian cholera, diphtheria, gangrene, ulcers of the tibia and the skin disease eczema. He worked at the University of Würzburg.

References 

1836 births
1932 deaths
20th-century German physicians